The San Francisco Recreation & Parks Department is the city agency responsible for governing and maintaining all city-owned parks and recreational facilities in San Francisco, California. The Recreation & Parks Department also runs Sharp Park in Pacifica, California and Camp Mather in Tuolumne County, California. The department runs 179 playgrounds and play areas, 82 recreation centers and clubhouses, nine swimming pools, five golf courses, 151 tennis courts, 72 basketball courts, 59 soccer fields, numerous baseball diamonds, and other sports venues.

History

The San Francisco Recreation & Parks Department began in 1871 when city officials responding to residents' demands for a large public park established the Park Commission to oversee the development of Golden Gate Park.  As San Francisco grew over of the years, parks and facilities were added all over the city.  Separately the city was running playgrounds, athletic fields, and recreational facilities under the direction of the Recreation Commission.  In 1950 the two commissions were merged and the San Francisco Recreation & Park Department was born.

Organization
The general manager is appointed by the mayor of San Francisco.
General Manager Phil Ginsburg oversees a staff of over 850 that includes gardeners, foresters, natural resource, pest management and nursery specialists, recreation and summer camp staff, lifeguards, park rangers, carpenters, plumbers, electricians, metal shop/welders and painters plus many many more from the historic headquarters inside McLaren Lodge at the east end of Golden Gate Park.

Commissioners
The Recreation & Parks Department is governed by a seven-member commission who are also appointed by the mayor of San Francisco to four-year terms.  The commission president is elected by fellow commissioners.  Commission meetings are held once a month at San Francisco City Hall. Current members are: Mark Buell (President),
Allan Low (Vice President),
Gloria Bonilla,
Tom Harrison,
Meagan Levitan, and Eric McDonnell.

Concerns have been expressed by park advocates about the lack of diversity of opinion on the commission and in the department, due to the fact that all of the positions are appointed by the mayor of San Francisco.  In the past, there have been efforts to change the selection process for commissioners.  A prior proposal included having three commissioners appointed by the mayor of San Francisco, three commissioners appointed by the San Francisco Board of Supervisors and one additional appointment agreed to by the mayor of San Francisco and the president of the San Francisco Board of Supervisors. This proposal had five votes on the San Francisco Board of Supervisors but was not able to get the sixth vote necessary to put it on the ballot.

Major features

The department is responsible for over 220 neighborhood parks and Golden Gate Park, the largest and the fifth most visited park in the United States.  The Golden Gate National Recreation Area is federal and is administered by the National Park Service.

Golden Gate Park

Golden Gate Park is San Francisco's premier municipal park. Configured as a rectangle, the park is over three miles long east to west and about half a mile north to south.

McLaren Park

McLaren Park is the second largest municipal park in San Francisco.  Located in south-east San Francisco, the park is surrounded by the Excelsior, Crocker-Amazon, Visitacion Valley, Portola and University Mound neighborhoods.

Dolores Park

Dolores Park is a city park located two blocks south of Mission Dolores at the western edge of the Mission District.  Dolores Park is bounded by 18th Street on the north, 20th Street on the south, Dolores Street on the east and Church Street on the west.

Coit Tower

Coit Tower is a  tower in the Telegraph Hill neighborhood. The tower, in the city's Pioneer Park, was built in 1933 using Lillie Hitchcock Coit's bequest to beautify the city of San Francisco.  The tower was proposed in 1931 as an appropriate use of Coit's gift.

Zoo

The Zoo is owned by the Recreation & Parks Department and managed by its partner non-profit San Francisco Zoological Society.

Candlestick Park

Candlestick Park was home of the San Francisco 49ers through the 2013 season and was home of the San Francisco Giants until 2000.  In 2014 the 49ers moved to the new Levi's Stadium and Candlestick Park has been being torn down.

Kezar Stadium and Pavilion

Kezar Stadium is and outdoor 10,000 seat multi-purpose stadium located in the southeastern corner of Golden Gate Park.  Before being renovated and downsized in 1989 it was the former home of the San Francisco 49ers and the Oakland Raiders.   The adjacent Kezar Pavilion is an indoor arena built in 1924 and seats 4,000.

Boxer Stadium

Boxer Stadium is a 3,500 seat soccer-specific stadium built in 1953 within Balboa Park.  The primary tenant is the amateur men's San Francisco Soccer Football League.

Marina Harbor

The Marina Harbor is a public 671 slip small craft yacht harbor located in the Marina District across from the Marina Green.   Also located in the marina is the St. Francis Yacht Club and Golden Gate Yacht Club.

Palace of Fine Arts

The Palace of Fine Arts in the Marina District is a monumental structure originally constructed for the 1915 Panama-Pacific Exposition in order to exhibit works of art presented there. One of only a few surviving structures from the Exposition, it is the only one still situated on its original site. It was rebuilt in 1965, and renovation of the lagoon, walkways, and a seismic retrofit were completed in early 2009.

Corona Heights Park

Corona Heights Park is a 15-acre park in the Castro and Haight districts that commands a view of the city, downtown financial district and the bay. The park features the Randall Museum, which focuses on science, nature and the arts and features live animals, and is operated by the department.

Golf Courses

The Recreation & Parks Department has five golf courses in San Francisco and Pacifica, California. 
TPC Harding Park 
Sharp Park in Pacifica 
Gleneagles Golf Course in McLaren Park  
Golden Gate Park Golf Course
Lincoln Park

Camp Mather

Camp Mather is an overnight summer family cabin camp in Tuolumne County, California on Highway 120 near Yosemite National Park.  The 337-acre site is often referred to as the jewel of the department. Before becoming a camp the site was used by the construction workers who built the O'Shaughnessy Dam and Hetch Hetchy Reservoir in the 1920s.

Summer day camps
Summer child day camps include Pine Lake Day Camp at Pine Lake Park and Silver Tree Day Camp at Glen Park.

Swimming pools

The department has nine swimming pools spread all over the city.

Park Rangers

San Francisco (SF) Park Ranger, also known as SF Park Patrol Officer, is a non-sworn, unarmed, uniformed, park security, park safety, park service, park informational, and ambassadorial civilian employee of the San Francisco Recreation and Parks Department. Acting as ambassadors, they continue to serve visitors of San Francisco's parks. SF Park Rangers work shifts and operate 365 days a year, 7 days a week, 24 hours a day.

Although not law enforcement officers, part of their role is ensuring the safety and security on San Francisco Recreation and Parks Department properties. Using various vehicles including sedans, sport utility vehicles (SUVs), all terrain vehicles (ATVs), golf carts, and bikes, SF Park Rangers patrol on sites and respond to only non-emergency calls at more than 260 San Francisco Recreation and Parks Department facilities situated on 3,400 acres of land throughout the City and County of San Francisco. These include neighborhood parks, playgrounds, recreation centers, playing fields, natural areas, tennis courts, golf courses, park stadiums and administrative park offices.

History
The San Francisco Park Rangers were founded by William Hammond Hall, San Francisco's first Superintendent of Parks, who established what was known as the Park Guard in 1874. San Francisco Parks has had its own special patrol unit since.

Park Ranger duties
Under immediate supervision, San Francisco (SF) Park Rangers provide security patrol services in assigned areas of the San Francisco Recreation and Parks Department in connection with preventing damage, destruction, or theft on park and recreation grounds and facilities. SF Park Rangers observe and report incidents requiring law enforcement, fire department, and emergency medical response. Furthermore, their duties and responsibilities include closing parking lot gates and locking/securing recreational centers, bathrooms, other properties, etc. at night; opening parking lot gates and unlocking recreational centers, bathrooms, other properties, etc. in the morning; posting signs; inspecting equipments, buildings, facilities, grounds; removing road obstructions; reporting safety hazards; providing information and directions to assist the public around the park system and park events; prevents improper or prohibited use of recreational facilities and equipment by park users; passively asking persons to depart the parks after park posted hours or for violation of the San Francisco Park Code; continuously patrolling all San Francisco Recreation and Parks Department facilities, greenways, natural areas, and waterfronts; performing security checks and parking enforcement only on San Francisco Recreation and Parks Department properties; and issuing parking and "notice to appear" civil citations for park code violations when necessary. As the designated employees on San Francisco Recreation and Parks Department sites, SF Park Rangers only respond to non-emergency calls from the San Francisco Recreation and Parks Department Dispatch, including scene-safe urgent situations, alarm response, non-police calls, non-criminal calls, park code violation complaints, and park use permit disputes. However, SF Park Rangers do Not respond to crime in-progress calls, person with any weapon calls, suspicious vehicle calls, safety risk calls, and other calls requiring initial law enforcement presence and clearance. SF Park Rangers may also be tasked with crime prevention, public safety assistance, maintaining the preservation and protection of park wildlife and arboretums. Only if requested, SF Park Rangers may provide support to emergency services personnel such as sheriff's deputies, police officers, firefighters, and emergency medical technicians/paramedics.

Park Ranger Authority
San Francisco (SF) Park Rangers are San Francisco governmental civilian employees and only act as non-sworn public officers on San Francisco Recreation and Parks Department sites. SF Park Rangers enforce the rules and regulations of the San Francisco Park Code, but may also enforce other applicable San Francisco ordinances, and applicable local and state parking violations on San Francisco Recreation and Parks Department sites. To enforce the park code safely, SF Park Rangers need voluntary compliance from persons suspected of park code violations. If park code enforcement can be done safely while solely rely on voluntary compliance, SF Park Rangers utilize verbal warnings and civil violation citations to enforce park code violations.  To avoid any potential physical confrontations, SF Park Rangers must call the San Francisco Police Department (SFPD) Dispatch for assistance in dealing with persons who are non-compliant with the park ranger's requests, individuals with mental health conditions, and incidents outside the course and scope of the SF Park Rangers' training, duties, and authority. SF Park Rangers must deescalate incidents and must Not engage in any pursuits and confrontations. SF Park Rangers are Not peace officers, therefore are Not authorize to initiate any traffic enforcement stops, and may Not pull over any vehicle for any violation regardless of the circumstances and location. Additionally, there is No legal obligation to yield to any park ranger non-emergency vehicles with amber (yellow) flashing lights and/or white spotlight. Like all other security officers, upon observation of a crime in the presence of the park ranger, the park ranger may apprehend the suspect engaging in specific crimes and temporarily hold the suspect on the scene for law enforcement officers to handle. Any apprehension by SF park rangers are very rare though. When encountering criminal activity, SF Park Rangers will observe and report the incident to SFPD Dispatch. SF Park Rangers making arrests for misdemeanor or felony offenses do so only as private citizens at their own risk, must immediately report the arrest to SFPD Dispatch, must turn the arrested person over to SFPD officers on the scene.

Park Ranger Equipment
San Francisco (SF) Park Rangers are unarmed (do Not carry any firearms), but do carry limited self-defense equipment including batons, pepper sprays, and handcuffs. SF Park Rangers wear body-worn camera systems. For patrol on site and transport to different San Francisco Recreation and Parks Department sites, SF Park Rangers operate marked park ranger non-emergency vehicles installed with only amber (yellow) warning lights and white spotlights. At times, SF Park Rangers utilize a public announcement (PA) speaker and air horn installed on their city vehicles to communicate with the public on San Francisco Recreation and Parks Department properties. Any siren use is unauthorized and unlawful.

Park Rangers Staffing and Controversies
Over recent years, the number of San Francisco Recreation and Parks Department Park Rangers has grew exponentially despite budget deficits and the failure of its initial mission to descrease mischievous acts of vandalism and graffiti on park properties. The department initially employed less than 10 full time park rangers supplemented by part time as needed positions, but currently employs more than 50 full time permanent park rangers with full benefits. Despite the staffing increase and higher cost to employ these park rangers, cases of vandalism and graffiti soar through the record. It shows that these park rangers do not prevent even the most minor acts of delinquency to lower clean up and repair cost, but just more employees on the San Francisco civil service payroll. The number of park rangers is totally unnecessary. To justify the existence of these extra park ranger positions and partially make up for their variable budget, they indiscriminately issue citations for the most trival matters. In addition, these park rangers are paid more and have less responsibilities than similar park ranger positions in surrounding counties and municipalities within a 25-mile distance. In Marin County, San Mateo County, and nearby cities such as Fremont, park rangers also have nature interpretation duties and/or park maintenance duties, but are paid unproportionally less for their work in comparison to San Francisco Park Rangers.
Another very controversial matter is the requirement for event organizers to pay park ranger fees for permits to hold special events on park properties. This requirement means San Francisco Park Rangers can work security details at the special events and are paid the overtime rate by the department. This cost more to event organizers instead of having private security on site. Not only event organizers, San Francisco taxpayers also have to pay part of the overtime bill. San Francisco Park Rangers are also criticized for excessive and arbitrary enforcement of the San Francisco Park Code to drive up infraction citations, especially for merely being in the parks during night time. Instead of the focus to protect park properties, San Francisco Park Rangers are deployed to so called "hot spots" to issue more infraction citations. Most infraction citations have fines and generate more revenue for the department. Because most contacts in the parks are with the homeless community, park rangers disproportionately issue the most infraction citations to persons who are displaced, homeless, and many times, with mental health conditions. In the name of "well-being" checks and offering services, San Francisco Park Rangers harass transients and try to make them leave the parks.
There are also credible sources alleging that a few San Francisco Park Rangers often acting outside the course and the scope of their duty and  authority as park security and park code enforcement. Recently, in the last few years, San Francisco Park Rangers have been increasingly intrusive and take advantage of people's lack of awareness to infringe on people's rights. Even though they are not law enforcement officers, they frequently try to detain people based on mere suspicion, even to the point of putting hands and handcuffs on individuals for no legitimate purposes. A few of these San Francisco Park Rangers are also unlawfully attempting to stop moving vehicles and unlawfully blocking parked vehicles from leaving the parks using their San Francisco Recreation and Parks Department park ranger vehicles. This is legally questionable, unsafe, and potentially a liability issue for San Francisco. Despite San Francisco Park Rangers are Not law enforcement officers, few of these San Francisco Park Rangers often try to intimate people to voluntarily provide their identification and that information is entered into their so-called unofficial "field-interview" contact database. Even though there is absolutely no need to get identification, they unnecessarily contact people to try to obtain identification documents from drivers even for minor parking violations. Multiple witnesses reported one ranger supervisor even used threatening language to try getting identification from a human rights demonstration activist.
On at least one occasion, after unwelcomely calling an ambulance for an intoxicated person on the street, a San Francisco Park Ranger asked for identification from that person. Of course the person have the right to decline the identification request. One San Francisco Park Ranger even unnecessarily questioned whether a person is on probation or parole. Thus, there have been avoidable instances of San Francisco Park Rangers escalating incidents to require unnecessary responses from law enforcement officers. At times，San Francisco Park Rangers interfere with law enforcement officers when trying to provide unrequested and unnecessary assistance. 
Few of these San Francisco Park Rangers unnecessarily dress their uniforms and carry excessive defensive gear for a militarized appearance like they are going to a war zone. At least two San Francisco Park Rangers even needlessly retain double-magzine holders on their duty belt when San Francisco Park Rangers do Not even carry firearms. Presumably, these particular San Francisco Park Rangers may want people to think they are armed when in fact they are Not armed. The lack of regulations on their uniform appearances, self-defensive gear, and unnecessary conduct are a grave concern for the community. 
On multiple occasions, especially during nighttime, these San Francisco Park Rangers opearating city non-emergency vehicles were observed speeding through public streets and violating multiple traffic laws.
Presumably, they are probably trying to "chase" vehicles and intimate the drivers on and off park property. This conduct is very dangerous to the public. 
Because many of these San Francisco Park Rangers often try to act like law enforcement, there have been many calls to significantly modify the uniforms, equipment, and vehicles of the San Francisco Park Rangers to resemble less like actual law enforcement officers to better fit and serve the community.
If there are no changes soon, it will just be a matter of time before these park rangers get themselves hurt or even worst, hurting members of the public.

See also
List of parks in San Francisco

References
Park Ranger https://www.jobapscloud.com/SF/specs/classspecdisplay.asp?ClassNumber=8208&R1=&R3=

External links
 Official website

Government of San Francisco
 
1871 establishments in California